Kat Hing Wai is a Punti walled village in the Yuen Long District of Hong Kong. The village is popularly known as Kam Tin, from the name of the local area. Kat Hing Wai is home to about 400 descendants of the Tang Clan, one of the "Five Great Clans" of the territory who settled here from China during the Song Dynasty. The village walls were added in the 17th century. The Tangs are Punti people descended from Southern China and were the first to settle in Hong Kong. Kat Hing Wai's residents speak the Weitou dialect, a Yue dialect.

Three other walled villages, Wing Lung Wai, Tai Hong Wai, and Kam Hing Wai are located nearby and were built around the same time.

Administration
Kat Hing Wai is a recognized village under the New Territories Small House Policy.

History
Kat Hing Wai was established during the reign of the Ming Chenghua Emperor (r. 1464–1487). The walls enclosing Kat Hing Wai were built by Tang Chue-yin and Tang Chik-kin in the early years of the Kangxi reign (1661–1722) of the Qing dynasty.

The Six-Day War (1899) was fought between the British Empire and the major punti clans of the New Territories in Hong Kong on 14–19 April 1899. The Tang Clan joined other punti clans in resisting the British takeover of the New Territories and established a defensive position at Kat Hing Wai. After the British defeated the punti clans, the iron gates were symbolically dismantled and shipped to London to be put on display. Following repatriation requests from the Tang Clan in 1924, the gate was eventually returned in 1925 by Sir Edward Stubbs. As a celebration, Kat Hing Wai displays a tablet as an account of this incident by the entrance. Because of this, Kat Hing Wai became a very unique place where have a strong icon in both architectural and historical background to be studied.

Features
Kat Hing Wai is a quasi-rectangular walled village with seven meters high brick walls, originally used to protect from pirates and another clans' invasion. The village area is about eighty-meter square (i.e. a square with a side length of 80 meters). As a family stronghold, Kat Hing Wai has served the Tangs well through the centuries, protecting the residents against bandits, rival clans, and wild tigers. During the Qing dynasty, a five-metre high blue brick wall and four cannon towers were added to defend against bandits. Today, the village is still completely surrounded by 18-inch-thick walls, outside which are the remains of a moat. However, most houses within the walls have been rebuilt in recent years.

There is only one narrow entrance, with a pair of iron gates that were removed by the British in 1899 and only one was eventually returned in 1924. The current standing gates are a mismatched pair, the left hand side originally belongs to Tai Hong Wai and was given to Kat Hing Wai as a gift when the right gate was returned.

Conservation
Kat Hing Wai is a private property. The Acting Secretary for Home Affairs stated in 2002 that the Antiquities and Monuments Office was negotiating with its owners in order to obtain their agreement to preserve the walled village as a monument. In 2010, the entrance gate, the shrine, the four watchtowers and the enclosing walls of Kat Hing Wai were collectively listed as Grade I historic buildings.

Access
Route:  Kam Sheung Road station or Kowloon Motor Bus bus routes 51, 54, 64K and 251M.

See also
 Walled villages of Hong Kong

References

External links

 Delineation of area of existing village Kat Hing Wai (Kam Tin) for election of resident representative (2019 to 2022)
 Antiquities and Monuments Office. Hong Kong Traditional Chinese Architectural Information System. Kat Hing Wai
 Pictures by the Antiquities Advisory Board: shrine, entrance gate, northwest watchtower, northeast, southeast, southwest
 Historical photos of Kat Hing Wai at gwulo.com
 Pictures of Kat Hing Wai (personal website)
 Kat Hing Wai video tour

Walled villages of Hong Kong
Kam Tin
Villages in Yuen Long District, Hong Kong